Oclaro was a US-based business manufacturing and selling optical components. Oclaro was formerly listed on the London Stock Exchange and was a constituent of the FTSE 100 Index. The company is now part of Lumentum (LITE) after being acquired in December 2018.

History 
The Company was founded in the United Kingdom in 1988 as Bookham Technology. It became the first company to make optical components that can be integrated into a silicon integrated circuit. In 2002 the Company expanded substantially when it acquired the optical components businesses of Marconi and Nortel Networks.
In 2003 it acquired Cierra Photonics of Santa Rosa, California, and New Focus, a US business, for GB£118 million.
In 2004 it acquired Onetta, Inc. and became a US-domiciled company. In March 2006, Bookham acquired Avalon Photonics based in Zurich, Switzerland

Avanex Corporation was incorporated in 1997 and had their initial public offering on February 4, 2000, raising US$216 million, and was based in Fremont, California.
By 2002 (after the dot-com bubble had burst) restructuring included shutting down a plant in Richardson, Texas.
In 2003 Avanex acquired Alcatel Optronics France SA from Alcatel and the photonic technology business of Corning Incorporated.

In the first quarter of 2009 Bookham faced increased losses on sales reducing from $50M to $47M.
In late April 2009 the Bookham and Avanex Corporations announced that they had merged, creating what they hoped would be one of the largest suppliers of optical components, modules and subsystems for telecommunications. The newly combined company was named Oclaro combining the words Optical and Clarity.

Opnext, Inc. was founded as a venture of the Clarity Group and optical researchers from Hitachi.
Opnext raised over $253M on their initial public offering on February 15, 2007.
On March 26, 2012, Oclaro, Inc. announced the acquisition of Opnext. The merger between Oclaro and Opnext was approved by shareholders of each company on July 23, 2012.

On September 12, 2013, Oclaro, Inc. announced the sale of their Zurich Gallium Arsenide Laser Diode Business to II-VI Incorporated for $115M. As part of the agreement, II-VI has purchased the Oclaro Zurich, Switzerland company, which includes its GaAs fabrication facility, and also the corresponding high power laser diodes, VCSEL and 980 nm pump laser product lines, including intellectual property, inventory, equipment and a related R&D facility in Tucson, Arizona all of which are associated with these businesses. Revenues for the Zurich business were approximately $87M for the fiscal year ended June 29th 2013.

The company designs, manufacturers and sells optical components primarily for fiber-optic communication networks.

Oclaro was acquired by Lumentum in December 2018 for approximately $1.8 billion.

References

10. ^Oclaro Sells Zurich Gallium Arsenide Laser Diode Business to II-VI Incorporated for $115 Million

11. ^Lumentum Announces Completion Of Oclaro Acquisition

External links
 Official web site

Manufacturing companies established in 1988
Manufacturing companies based in San Jose, California
Companies formerly listed on the London Stock Exchange
2018 mergers and acquisitions